This is a list of National Hockey League (NHL) players who have played at least one game in the NHL from 1917 to present and have a last name that starts with "P".

List updated as of the 2018–19 NHL season.

Pa

 Magnus Paajarvi
 Clayton Pachal
 Max Pacioretty
 Cam Paddock
 John Paddock
 Jim Paek
 Nathan Paetsch
 Jean-Gabriel Pageau
 Paul Pageau
 Samuel Pahlsson
 Rosaire Paiement
 Wilf Paiement
 Daniel Paille
 Marcel Paille
 Iiro Pakarinen
 Pete Palangio
 Ondrej Palat
 Aldo Palazzari
 Doug Palazzari
 Zigmund Palffy
 Michael Paliotta
 Mike Palmateer
 Brad Palmer
 Jarod Palmer
 Rob Palmer (born 1952)
 Rob Palmer (born 1956)
 Kyle Palmieri
 Nick Palmieri
 Aaron Palushaj
 Eddie Panagabko
 Artemi Panarin
 Jay Pandolfo
 Mike Pandolfo
 Darren Pang
 Richard Panik
 Greg Pankewicz
 Grigorijs Pantelejevs
 Joe Papike
 Justin Papineau
 Jim Pappin
 Cedric Paquette
 Bob Paradise
 Colton Parayko
 Adam Pardy
 Bernie Parent
 Bob Parent
 Rich Parent
 Ryan Parent
 P. A. Parenteau
 George Pargeter
 J. P. Parise
 Zach Parise
 Michel Parizeau
 Brad Park
 Richard Park
 Jeff Parker
 Scott Parker
 Ernie Parkes
 Greg Parks
 Mark Parrish
 Dave Parro
 George Parros
 Scott Parse
 George Parsons
 Timo Parssinen
 Dusan Pasek
 Dave Pasin
 Greg Paslawski
 Eddie Pasquale
 Steve Passmore
 David Pastrnak
 Pavel Patera
 Joe Paterson
 Mark Paterson
 Rick Paterson
 Greg Pateryn
 Doug Patey
 Larry Patey
 Craig Patrick
 Glenn Patrick
 James Patrick
 Lester Patrick
 Lynn Patrick
 Murray "Muzz" Patrick
 Nolan Patrick
 Steve Patrick
 Colin Patterson
 Dennis Patterson
 Ed Patterson
 George Patterson
 Dimitri Patzold
 Butch Paul
 Jeff Paul
 Nick Paul
 Roland Paulhus
 Ondrej Pavelec
 Mark Pavelich
 Marty Pavelich
 Joe Pavelski
 Jim Pavese
 Evariste Payer
 Serge Payer
 Adam Payerl
 Davis Payne
 Steve Payne
 Kent Paynter

Pe

 Pat Peake
 Mel Pearson
 Rob Pearson
 Scott Pearson
 Tanner Pearson
 Stephen Peat
 Matthew Peca
 Michael Peca
 Alexander Pechursky
 Theo Peckham
 Andrey Pedan
 Allen Pedersen
 Barry Pederson
 Denis Pederson
 Lane Pederson
 Mark Pederson
 Tom Pederson
 Andrew Peeke
 Bert Peer
 Pete Peeters
 Johnny Peirson
 Adam Pelech
 Matt Pelech
 Perry Pelensky
 Scott Pellerin
 Jean-Marc Pelletier
 Marcel Pelletier
 Pascal Pelletier
 Roger Pelletier
 Rod Pelley
 Andre Peloffy
 Derek Peltier
 Ville Peltonen
 Anthony Peluso
 Mike Peluso (born 1965)
 Mike Peluso (born 1974)
 Mike Pelyk
 Dustin Penner
 Jeff Penner
 Chad Penney
 Steve Penney
 Cliff Pennington
 Jim Peplinski
 Nick Perbix
 Stuart Percy
 Alexander Perezhogin
 Brendan Perlini
 Fred Perlini
 Joel Perrault
 Bob Perreault
 Fern Perreault
 Gilbert Perreault
 Mathieu Perreault
 Yanic Perreault
 Eric Perrin
 David Perron
 Nathan Perrott
 Brian Perry
 Corey Perry
 Joel Persson
 John Persson
 Ricard Persson
 Stefan Persson
 Brett Pesce
 Harri Pesonen
 Janne Pesonen
 George Pesut
 Nic Petan
 Andrew Peters
 Frank Peters
 Garry Peters
 Jimmy Peters, Sr.
 Jimmy Peters, Jr.
 Steve Peters
 Warren Peters
 Cal Petersen
 Toby Petersen
 Brent Peterson (born 1958)
 Brent Peterson (born 1972)
 Andre Petersson
 Richard Petiot
 Michel Petit
 Nick Petrecki
 Lennart Petrell
 Sergei Petrenko
 Oleg Petrov
 Alex Petrovic
 Robert Petrovicky
 Ronald Petrovicky
 Jakub Petruzalek
 Jeff Petry
 Elias Pettersson
 Jorgen Pettersson
 Marcus Pettersson
 Jim Pettie
 Tomi Pettinen
 Eric Pettinger
 Gordon Pettinger
 Matt Pettinger
 Rich Peverley

Ph–Pi

 Lyle Phair
 Dion Phaneuf
 Harold Phillipoff
 Bill "Bat" Phillips
 Charlie "Red" Phillips
 Chris Phillips
 Merlyn "Bill" Phillips
 Alexandre Picard
 Alexandre R. Picard
 Michel Picard
 Noel Picard
 Robert Picard
 Roger Picard
 Clement Piche
 Dave Pichette
 Calvin Pickard
 Hal Picketts
 Harry Pidhirny
 Timo Pielmeier
 Randy Pierce
 Blake Pietila
 Alex Pietrangelo
 Frank Pietrangelo
 Tuomas Pihlman
 Antti Pihlstrom
 Alf Pike
 Ilkka Pikkarainen
 Karel Pilar
 Rich Pilon
 Pierre Pilote
 Lawrence Pilut
 Gerry Pinder
 Brian Pinho
 Adam Pineault
 Steve Pinizzotto
 Shane Pinto
 Neal Pionk
 Lasse Pirjeta
 Esa Pirnes
 Kamil Piros
 Brandon Pirri
 Alex Pirus
 Ales Pisa
 Fernando Pisani
 Joe Piskula
 Joni Pitkanen
 Lance Pitlick
 Rem Pitlick
 Didier Pitre
 Domenic Pittis
 Libor Pivko
 Michal Pivonka

Pl

 Barclay Plager
 Bill Plager
 Bob Plager
 Gerry Plamondon
 Alex Plante
 Cam Plante
 Dan Plante
 Derek Plante
 Jacques Plante
 Pierre Plante
 Mark Plantery
 Michel Plasse
 Geoff Platt
 Adrien Plavsic
 Hugh Plaxton
 Jim Playfair
 Larry Playfair
 Larry Pleau
 Tomas Plekanec
 Vaclav Pletka
 Charles Pletsch
 Willi Plett
 Tomas Plihal
 Sergei Plotnikov
 Rob Plumb
 Ron Plumb

Po

 Steve Poapst
 Thomas Pock
 Harvie Pocza
 Walt Poddubny
 Shjon Podein
 Andrej Podkonicky
 Ray Podloski
 Jason Podollan
 Nels Podolsky
 Ryan Poehling
 Rudy Poeschek
 Tony Poeta
 Austin Poganski
 Justin Pogge
 John Pohl
 Bud Poile
 Don Poile
 Brayden Point
 Emile Poirier
 Gordon Poirier
 Roman Polak
 Vojtech Polan
 Tom Polanic
 John Polich
 Mike Polich
 Greg Polis
 Dan Poliziani
 Jame Pollock
 Dennis Polonich
 Jason Pominville
 Alexei Ponikarovsky
 Paul Pooley
 Tucker Poolman
 Larry Popein
 Poul Popiel
 Mark Popovic
 Peter Popovic
 Tomas Popperle
 Chris Porter
 Kevin Porter
 Jack Portland
 Jukka Porvari
 Victor Posa
 Mike Posavad
 Marek Posmyk
 Paul Postma
 Brian Pothier
 Tom Poti
 Barry Potomski
 Corey Potter
 Ryan Potulny
 Andrew Poturalski
 Denis Potvin
 Felix Potvin
 Jean Potvin
 Marc Potvin
 Daniel Poudrier
 Dan Poulin
 Dave Poulin
 Patrick Poulin
 Benoit Pouliot
 Derrick Pouliot
 Marc-Antoine Pouliot
 Jaroslav Pouzar
 Darroll Powe
 Ray Powell
 Owen Power
 Geoff Powis
 Lynn Powis

Pr

 Petr Prajsler
 Jack Pratt
 Kelly Pratt
 Nolan Pratt
 Tracy Pratt
 Walter "Babe" Pratt
 Tom Preissing
 Dean Prentice
 Eric "Doc" Prentice
 Wayne Presley
 Rich Preston
 Yves Preston

 Carey Price
 Jack Price
 Noel Price
 Pat Price
 Tom Price
 Ken Priestlay
 Cayden Primeau
 Joe Primeau
 Keith Primeau
 Kevin Primeau
 Wayne Primeau
 Shane Prince
 Ellis Pringle
 David Printz
 Bob Probert
 Martin Prochazka
 George "Goldie" Prodgers
 Nikolai Prokhorkin
 Vitali Prokhorov
 Mike Prokopec
 Chris Pronger
 Sean Pronger
 Andre Pronovost
 Claude Pronovost
 Jean Pronovost
 Marcel Pronovost
 Brian Propp
 Vaclav Prospal
 Ivan Prosvetov
 Christian Proulx
 Dalton Prout
 Ivan Provorov
 Claude Provost
 Joel Prpic
 Petr Prucha
 Martin Prusek
 Brandon Prust
 Sergei Pryakhin
 Chris Pryor
 Metro Prystai

Pu–Py

 Albert Pudas
 Matt Puempel
 Bob Pulford
 Jesse Puljujarvi
 David Pulkkinen
 Teemu Pulkkinen
 Ryan Pulock
 Daren Puppa
 Teddy Purcell
 Dale Purinton
 Cliff "Fido" Purpur
 John Purves
 Chris Pusey
 Konstantin Pushkarev
 Jamie Pushor
 Jean Pusie
 Nelson Pyatt
 Taylor Pyatt
 Tom Pyatt
 Mika Pyorala
 Mark Pysyk

See also
 hockeydb.com NHL Player List - P

Players